James Taylor Vinton Smith,  (3 November 1897 – 22 July 1952) was an Australian politician. He was the Member of the Victorian Legislative Assembly for Oakleigh from 1932 to 1937, for the United Australia Party.

Early life
He was born in 1897 in Parkside, a suburb of Adelaide, to Thomas Ladyman Home Smith and Minerva Mary Daniel. He was educated at Adelaide High School, and on 25 April 1915, joined the Bank of New South Wales in Adelaide as a bank clerk.

Military service
Vinton Smith enlisted in the Australian Imperial Force at Adelaide on 1 February 1916, and was assigned to the 113th Howitzer Battery of the 13th Brigade, with which he saw active service in France. He attained the rank of Lieutenant on 1 March 1917.

On 2 April 1919, he was awarded the Military Cross for gallantry during a battle on the Selle River in October 1918, for which he was also Mentioned in Despatches. The citation read:

Political career
Vinton Smith nominated as a candidate for the seat of Oakleigh in the Victorian Legislative Assembly at the 1932 Victorian state election. Although aligned with the United Australia Party, he was not the endorsed UAP candidate, and ran as an independent against the official UAP candidate and the Labor candidate, incumbent member Squire Reid. When the UAP candidate was eliminated, his second preferences gave him a majority over Reid, winning him the seat. Despite having defeated the endorsed candidate, Vinton Smith was immediately admitted to the UAP parliamentary party upon his election. Vinton Smith—this time fully endorsed by the UAP—narrowly defeated Reid again in the 1935 election, but Reid regained the seat in 1937.

Vinton Smith contested the federal by-election for Corio in 1940, but lost to the Labor candidate John Dedman.

Business career
After leaving politics, Vinton Smith returned to the financial sector. He founded a stock trading firm, which upon his death was left to two of his business partners, W.R. Dougall and F.J. Dean. The firm became known as Vinton Smith, Dean & Dougall, and later Vinton Smith Dougall, Ltd.

He was also chairman of Edments Holdings Ltd., and company director for F. J. Walker Ltd., Sydney; M. B. John Ltd., valve manufacturers, Ballarat; Silk and Textile Printers Ltd., Hobart; Modern Permanent Building Society Ltd., Carpet Manufacturers Ltd., Sydney; and several other companies.

Suicide
On 22 July 1952, Vinton Smith told his wife he was going to the shed at their Malvern East home to chop wood. She decided to check on him when she heard the chopping stop, and found him dead from a gunshot wound, with a 22-calibre rifle underneath his body. The city coroner ruled a verdict of suicide, noting that Vinton Smith had been suffering from a serious heart complaint and was "a candidate for a very early death" who appeared to have "shot himself on a sudden impulse".

When his will was lodged for probate, it was discovered that Vinton Smith had left a large estate worth £204,593.

References

External links
Re-Member Parliamentary Biography

1897 births
1952 deaths
Military personnel from South Australia
Members of the Victorian Legislative Assembly
United Australia Party members of the Parliament of Victoria
Australian Army officers
Australian military personnel of World War I
Recipients of the Military Cross
Australian stock traders
Australian military personnel who committed suicide
Australian politicians who committed suicide
Suicides by firearm in Victoria (Australia)
Politicians from Adelaide
20th-century Australian politicians
Australian bankers
People educated at Adelaide High School